Granny is a term and nickname for a grandmother, a female grandparent, and may refer to:

Characters
 Granny (Beverly Hillbillies character), a character on The Beverly Hillbillies television series, played by Irene Ryan
 Granny (Looney Tunes), a Looney Tunes character
 Granny Goodness, a Superman villainess
 George "Granny" Grantham, a character from the Stephen King novella Blockade Billy
 Granny character created by cartoonist Buck Brown for Playboy

Fictional works
 Granny (film), a 2003 Russian drama film
 Granny (video game), a popular horror video game created by DVloper which is part of the Slendrina series
 The Granny, a 1995 American horror comedy film
 Granny, a spin-off from the Cuddles and Dimples strip in the British Dandy comic
 Granny, a 1994 novel by Anthony Horowitz

People
 Granny Alston or Hallam Newton Egerton Alston (1908–1985), English cricketer
 Grantland Rice (1880–1954), American sportswriter
 Granny D or Doris Haddock (1910–2010), American political activist

Other uses
 Granny (orca), the oldest known orca
 Granny (sea anemone), a celebrated sea anemone from 19th-century Britain
 "Granny" (song), a song performed by Dave Matthews Band, popular at their live shows
 Granny (townland), a townland in County Londonderry, Northern Ireland

See also
 Granny Creek (disambiguation)
 Granny Smith (disambiguation)